Justice Sopinka wrote for a unanimous court in this appeal from the Alberta Court of Queen's Bench on a case in which a  Criminal Code section 486 publication ban was overturned by the trial judge, Justice Feehan, after he had found the primary witnesses for both sides of a sexual assault trial to be unreliable. 

Feehan J. considered as policy reasons in favour of lifting the publication ban that:

The Crown applied for leave to appeal directly to the Court from the order of the trial judge, pursuant to s. 40(1) of the Supreme Court Act, R.S.C., 1985, c. S-26. Mootness was raised by the respondent, and discarded by the court; In any event, even if the appeal were moot it would exercise discretion to hear the appeal. Jurisdiction of this issue was confirmed, and the Supreme Court reinstated the publication ban. Sopinka quoted approvingly Justice Lamer in Canadian Newspapers Co. v. Canada (Attorney General):

References

Supreme Court of Canada cases
Canadian constitutional case law
1995 in Canadian case law
Publication bans in Canadian case law